Wakafutase Tadayuki, born Tadateru Tojima (February 20, 1942 – May 20, 1997), was a sumo wrestler and coach from Nagoya, Aichi, Japan.  His highest rank was komusubi. He was the head coach of Asahiyama stable from 1975 until his death in 1997.

Career
He made his professional debut in September 1960, and reached the top division in March 1966. He won his only kinboshi in July 1968 when he defeated yokozuna Kashiwado on the opening day. This was also the only tournament in which he received a special prize, for Outstanding Performance. Following this performance he made his sanyaku debut at komusubi, a rank he was to hold three times in total. In January 1972 he was a tournament runner-up with a mere 10–5 record, as the yūshō was won by Tochiazuma with 11–4. (Wakafutase could have been involved in an eight-man playoff had ōzeki Kiyokuni defeated Tochiazuma on the final day.) Wakafutase did not miss a single bout in his career, making 1137 consecutive appearances.

Retirement from sumo
Upon retirement from active competition in March 1975 he became an elder in the Japan Sumo Association. He took over as head coach of Asahiyama stable in October 1975 after the sudden death of the former Futaseyama, and was involved in a dispute with the previous head coach's widow, which led to six Tongan wrestlers at the stable running away and eventually being dismissed by the Sumo Association.  This became an international incident with questions in the National Diet and the Sumo Association visiting the King of Tonga to explain, and Asahiyama was punished with a ten percent salary reduction for six months for his poor supervision of the situation.  Among the wrestlers he coached were juryo Iwatefuji and Genkai, and maegashira Daihishō. He died suddenly of an acute myocardial infarction while still an active oyakata in May 1997. Daihishō, who by then was the stable's only sekitori,  was injured in a bout against Tochinonada the day after Asahiyama's death and was out for two months, unable to attend his funeral. Due to Asahiyama's unexpected death there was no obvious successor available, and former ōzeki Daiju of the affiliated Tatsunami stable was asked to take over.

Career record

See also
Glossary of sumo terms
List of past sumo wrestlers
List of sumo tournament top division runners-up
List of sumo tournament second division champions
List of komusubi

References

1942 births
1997 deaths
Japanese sumo wrestlers
Sportspeople from Nagoya
Sumo people from Aichi Prefecture
Komusubi